In the context of a Jury trial, the term unsafe verdict refers to a judicial finding that a jury's guilty verdict is unsafe and should be overturned. Unsafe verdicts can be made for either legal or factual reasons.

In most common law jurisdictions, people convicted at jury trial are allowed to have the evidence and transcript of their trial reviewed by an appellate court.

Unsafe verdicts by jurisdiction

Australia 
Criminal appeals made on the ground that the jury's guilty verdict was unsafe and unsatisfactory; have been some of the most controversial legal cases in Australia. Both the Lindy Chamberlain case, as well as the appeal that led to the acquittal of George Pell were appeals made on the unsafe verdict ground before the High Court.

Authoritative cases on the unsafe verdict ground in Australia include M v The Queen, and Pell v The Queen. The currently applied test is whether the guilty verdict was 'open to the jury' to be satisfied of the accused's guilt beyond reasonable doubt. A finding of guilt by the jury will only be disturbed if the court makes a finding that the guilty verdict was not open to the jury.

England & Wales 
Opportunities for appealing in criminal cases were limited in criminal cases until the 20th century. However, unsafe verdicts are now an established ground of appeal for criminal cases in England and Wales. A prominent case in which this appeal ground has been cited in the UK, was in the appeal hearing regarding the rape conviction of Alex Hepburn.

See also 

 Court of Appeal (England and Wales)
 Appeals from the Crown Court (England and Wales)
 M v R

References 

Criminal law of the United Kingdom
Australian criminal law